Michael Schäfer (born 25 January 1959) is a Danish former football player and now manager. In his active career as a midfielder, he played 482 games for Danish club Lyngby BK, as well as three games for the Denmark national football team. At the moment he is a teacher at Virum Skole in Denmark.

Biography
Born in Rødovre in eastern Copenhagen, Schäfer started playing football with local club BK Avarta. He moved on to Lyngby BK, where he played for more than a decade, including the entire decade of the 1980s. He was called up for the Danish national team in July 1980, by national manager Sepp Piontek. In his three years in the national team, Schäfer was a bit-part player and played three national team matches.

He was a part of the Lyngby team that won the first major trophy in club history; the 1983 Danish championship. He also won the 1984 and 1985 Danish Cup trophies with the club. As Lyngby team captain, he captained the team to the 1990 Danish Cup title as well. Having played 482 matches for Lyngby BK, he retired in the fall 1990, 32 years old.

He then went on to be a manager. He started as an assistant coach for Lyngby BK in January 1991, but was promoted to head coach in September 1992, following the departure of Swedish coach Kent Karlsson. In 1995, he became the new manager of F.C. Copenhagen, but he was fired after only one season because of poor results. Since then he has been the manager of several clubs in the lower divisions, among them his former club BK Avarta.

He is also a football commentator for Danish TV3.

Honours
Danish championship: 1983
Danish Cup: 1984, 1985 and 1990

References

External links
Danish national team profile

1959 births
Living people
People from Rødovre
Association football midfielders
Danish men's footballers
Denmark under-21 international footballers
Denmark international footballers
Danish football managers
Lyngby Boldklub managers
F.C. Copenhagen managers
Ølstykke FC managers
Boldklubben af 1893 managers
Fremad Amager managers
BK Avarta managers
Sportspeople from the Capital Region of Denmark